The France national football team represents France in men's international football matches. It is governed by the French Football Federation (FFF), the governing body for football in France. It is a member of UEFA in Europe and FIFA in global competitions. The team's colors and imagery reference two national symbols: the French red-white-blue tricolour and Gallic rooster (coq gaulois). The team is colloquially known as Les Bleus (The Blues). They play home matches at the Stade de France in Saint-Denis and train at INF Clairefontaine in Clairefontaine-en-Yvelines.

Founded in 1904, the team has won two FIFA World Cups, two UEFA European Championships, two FIFA Confederations Cups, one Olympic Games, one CONMEBOL–UEFA Cup of Champions and one UEFA Nations League title. France was one of the four European teams that participated in the first World Cup in 1930. Twenty-eight years later, the team, led by Raymond Kopa and Just Fontaine, finished in third place at the 1958 World Cup. France experienced much of its success in three different eras: in the 1980s, from the 1990s to early 2000s, and during the late 2010s. In 1984, under the leadership of the three-time Ballon d'Or winner Michel Platini, France won Euro 1984 (its first official title), a CONMEBOL–UEFA Cup (1985), and reached two World Cup semi-finals (1982 and 1986).  

During the captaincy of Didier Deschamps, with Zinedine Zidane on the pitch, Les Bleus won the 1998 World Cup and Euro 2000. They also won the Confederations Cup in 2001 and 2003. Three years later, France made it to the final of the 2006 World Cup, losing 5–3 on penalties to Italy. 

A decade later, the team reached the final of Euro 2016, where they lost 1–0 to Portugal in extra time. Two years after that, France won the 2018 World Cup, its second title in that competition. After winning the 2021 Nations League, they became the first European national team to have won every senior FIFA and UEFA competition. 

France has footballing rivalries with Belgium, Brazil, Croatia, England, Germany, Italy, Portugal, and Spain.

History

Early years (1904–1930s)
The France national football team was created in 1904, around the time of FIFA's foundation. The team competed in its first official international match on 1 May 1904 against Belgium in Brussels, ending in a 3–3 draw. The following year, on 12 February 1905, France contested their first-ever home match against Switzerland. The match was played at the Parc des Princes in front of 500 supporters. France won the match 1–0 with the only goal coming from Gaston Cyprès. Due to disagreements between FIFA and the Union des Sociétés Françaises de Sports Athlétiques (USFSA), the country's sports union, France struggled to establish an identity. On 9 May 1908, the French Interfederal Committee (CFI), a rival organization to the USFSA, ruled that FIFA would now be responsible for the club's appearances in forthcoming Olympic Games and not the USFSA. In 1919, the CFI transformed themselves into the French Football Federation (FFF). In 1921, the USFSA finally merged with the FFF.

In July 1930, France appeared in the inaugural FIFA World Cup, held in Uruguay. In their first-ever World Cup match, France defeated Mexico 4–1 at the Estadio Pocitos in Montevideo. Lucien Laurent became notable in the match as he scored not only France's first World Cup goal, but the first goal in World Cup history. Conversely, France also became the first team to not score in a World Cup match after losing 1–0 to group stage opponents Argentina. Another loss to Chile resulted in the team bowing out in the group stage. The following year saw the first selection of a black player to the national team. Raoul Diagne, who was of Senegalese descent, earned his first cap on 15 February in a 2–1 defeat to Czechoslovakia. Diagne later played with the team at the 1938 World Cup, alongside Larbi Benbarek, who was one of the first players of North African origin to play for the national team. At the 1934 World Cup, France suffered elimination in the opening round, losing 3–2 to Austria. On the team's return to Paris, they were greeted as heroes by a crowd of over 4,000 supporters. France hosted the 1938 World Cup and reached the quarterfinals, losing 3–1 to defending champions (and eventual 1938 winners) Italy.

1950s–1980s
France's first 'Golden Generation' in the late 1950s comprised players such as Just Fontaine, Raymond Kopa, Jean Vincent, Robert Jonquet, Maryan Wisnieski, Thadée Cisowski, and Armand Penverne. At the 1958 World Cup, France reached the semi-finals losing to Brazil. In the third-place match, France defeated West Germany 6–3 with Fontaine recording four goals, which brought his goal tally in the competition to 13, a World Cup record. The record still stands today. France hosted the inaugural UEFA European Football Championship in 1960. For the second straight international tournament, the team reached the semi-finals, but were defeated 5–4 by Yugoslavia despite being up 4–2 heading into the 75th minute. In the third-place match, France was defeated 2–0 by Czechoslovakia.

The 1960s and 70s saw France decline significantly playing under several managers and failing to qualify for numerous international tournaments. On 25 April 1964, Henri Guérin was officially installed as the team's first manager. Under Guérin, France failed to qualify for the 1962 World Cup and the 1964 European Nations' Cup. The team returned to major international play with qualification for the 1966 World Cup, but did not make it past the group stage phase of the tournament. Guérin was fired following the World Cup. He was replaced by José Arribas and Jean Snella, who worked as caretaker managers in dual roles. The two only lasted four matches and were replaced by former international Just Fontaine, who in turn was only in charge for two matches. Louis Dugauguez succeeded Fontaine and following his early struggles in qualification for the 1970 World Cup, was fired and replaced by Georges Boulogne, who could not get the team to the competition. Boulogne was later fired following his failure to qualify for the 1974 World Cup and was replaced by the Romanian Ștefan Kovács, who became the only international manager to ever manage the national team. Under the management of Kovács, France failed to qualify for UEFA Euro 1976. After two years in charge, he was sacked and replaced with Michel Hidalgo.

Under Hidalgo, France flourished, mainly due to the accolades of great players like defenders Marius Trésor and Maxime Bossis, striker Dominique Rocheteau and midfielder Michel Platini, who, alongside Jean Tigana, Alain Giresse and Luis Fernández formed the "carré magique" ("Magic Square"), which would haunt opposing defenses beginning at the 1982 World Cup, where France reached the semi-finals losing on penalties to rivals West Germany. The semi-final match-up is considered one of the greatest matches in World Cup history and was marked by controversy. France finished fourth overall, losing the third-place playoff 3–2 to Poland. France earned their first major international honor two years later, winning Euro 1984, which they hosted. Under the leadership of Platini, who scored a tournament-high nine goals, France defeated Spain 2–0 in the final. Platini and Bruno Bellone scored the goals. Following the Euro triumph, Hidalgo departed the team and was replaced by former international Henri Michel. France subsequently won gold at the 1984 Summer Olympics football tournament and, a year later, defeated Uruguay 2–0 to win the Artemio Franchi Trophy, an early precursor to the FIFA Confederations Cup. Dominique Rocheteau and José Touré scored the goals. In a span of a year, France were holders of three of the four major international trophies. At the 1986 World Cup, France were among the favorites to win the competition. For the second consecutive World Cup, they reached the semi-finals and faced West Germany. Again, they were defeated by Germany but achieved third place with a 4–2 victory over Belgium.

In 1988, the FFF opened the Clairefontaine National Football Institute. Its opening ceremony was attended by then-President of France, François Mitterrand. Five months after Clairefontaine's opening, manager Henri Michel was fired and was replaced by Michel Platini, who failed to get the team to the 1990 World Cup.

First successes (1990s–2000s)
Platini did lead the team to Euro 1992 and, despite going on a 19-match unbeaten streak prior to the competition, suffered elimination in the group stage. A week after the completion of the tournament, Platini stepped down as manager and was replaced by his assistant Gérard Houllier. Under Houllier, France and its supporters experienced a major disappointment in failing to qualify for the 1994 World Cup. With two matches to play, qualification had been all but secured with matches remaining against last-placed Israel and in-contention Bulgaria. However, France was upset at home by Israel 3–2 after leading 2–1 late in the match and, against Bulgaria, conceded a 90th-minute goal for a 2–1 defeat. The subsequent blame and public outcry led to the firing of Houllier and departure of several players from the national team fold. Houllier's assistant Aimé Jacquet was appointed as manager.

Under Jacquet, the national team achieved multiple successes. The squad comprised some experienced players from the group that had failed to reach the 1994 FIFA World Cup as well as some talented younger players, such as Zinedine Zidane. The team reached the semi-finals of Euro 1996, where they lost 6–5 on penalties to the Czech Republic. The team's next major tournament was the 1998 World Cup, which France hosted. France went through the tournament undefeated and became the seventh nation to win the World Cup, defeating Brazil 3–0 in the final at the Stade de France in Paris. Jacquet stepped down after the country's World Cup triumph and was succeeded by assistant Roger Lemerre who guided them through Euro 2000. Led by FIFA World Player of the Year Zidane, France defeated Italy 2–1 in the final. David Trezeguet scored the golden goal in extra time. The victory gave the team the distinction of holding both the World Cup and Euro titles, a feat first achieved by West Germany in 1974; this was also the first time that a reigning World Cup winner went on to capture the Euro. Following the result, the France national team was accorded the number one spot in the FIFA World Rankings. In the following year, the team won the 2001 FIFA Confederations Cup.

After this period of achievement, France were much less successful in subsequent tournaments, and failed to make it past the group stage at the 2002 World Cup. One of the greatest shocks in World Cup history saw France defeated 1–0 by debutantes Senegal in the opening game of the tournament. France became only the second nation to be eliminated in the first-round as World Cup holders, the first being Brazil in 1966. After the 2010, 2014, and 2018 World Cups, Italy, Spain, and Germany were also added to this list. After France finished bottom of the group, Lemerre was dismissed and was replaced by Jacques Santini. A full-strength team started out strongly at Euro 2004, but they were upset in the quarter-finals by the eventual winners Greece. Santini resigned as coach and Raymond Domenech was picked as his replacement. France struggled in the early qualifiers for the 2006 World Cup. This prompted Domenech to persuade several past members out of international retirement to help the national team qualify, which they accomplished following a convincing 4–0 win over Cyprus on the final day of qualifying. In the 2006 World Cup final stages, France finished undefeated in the group stage portion and advanced to the final, defeating Spain, Brazil, and Portugal in the knockout matches. France played Italy in the final. The match finished  1–1 after extra time, with Italy winning 5–3 on penalties to be crowned World Cup champions. The match featured a notable incident during extra time that led to captain Zinedine Zidane being sent off.

Downfall (2008–2015)
France started its qualifying round for Euro 2008 strong and qualified for the tournament, despite two defeats to Scotland. France bowed out during the group stage portion of the tournament after having been placed in the group of death (which included Netherlands and Italy). Just like the team's previous World Cup qualifying campaign, the 2010 campaign got off to a disappointing start with France suffering disastrous losses and earning uninspired victories. France eventually finished second in the group and earned a spot in the UEFA play-offs against the Republic of Ireland for a place in South Africa. In the first leg, France defeated the Irish 1–0 and in the second leg procured a 1–1 draw, via controversial circumstances, to qualify for the World Cup.

In the 2010 World Cup final stages, the team continued to perform under expectations and were eliminated in the group stage, while the negative publicity the national team received during the competition led to further repercussions back in France. Midway through the competition, striker Nicolas Anelka was dismissed from the national team after reportedly having a dispute, in which obscenities were passed, with team manager Raymond Domenech during half-time of the team's loss to Mexico. The resulting disagreement over Anelka's expulsion between the players, the coaching staff and FFF officials resulted in the players boycotting training before their third game. In response to the training boycott, Sports Minister Roselyne Bachelot lectured the players and "reduced France's disgraced World Cup stars to tears with an emotional speech on the eve of their final group A match". France then lost their final game 2–1 to the hosts South Africa and failed to advance to the knockout stage. The day after the team's elimination, it was reported by numerous media outlets that then President of France Nicolas Sarkozy would meet with team captain Thierry Henry to discuss the issues associated with the team's meltdown at the World Cup, at Henry's request. Following the completion of the World Cup tournament, Federation President Jean-Pierre Escalettes resigned from his position.

Domenech, whose contract had expired, was succeeded as head coach by former international Laurent Blanc. On 23 July 2010, at the request of Blanc, the FFF suspended all 23 players in the World Cup squad for the team's friendly match against Norway after the World Cup. On 6 August, five players who were deemed to have played a major role in the training boycott were disciplined for their roles.

At Euro 2012 in Poland and Ukraine, France reached the quarter-finals, where they were beaten by eventual champions Spain. Following the tournament, coach Laurent Blanc resigned and was succeeded by Didier Deschamps, who captained France to glory in the 1998 World Cup and Euro 2000. His team qualified for the 2014 World Cup by beating Ukraine in the playoffs, and Deschamps then extended his contract until Euro 2016. Missing star midfielder Franck Ribéry through injury, France lost to eventual champions Germany in the quarter-finals courtesy of an early goal by Mats Hummels. Paul Pogba was awarded the Best Young Player award during the tournament.

Current France (2016–present)

France automatically qualified as hosts for Euro 2016. Karim Benzema and Hatem Ben Arfa were not in the squad. France were drawn in Group A of the tournament alongside Romania, Switzerland and Albania. France won their group with wins over Romania and Albania and a goalless draw against Switzerland and were poised to play the Republic of Ireland in the round of sixteen. Ireland took the lead after just two minutes through a controversially awarded penalty, which was converted by Robbie Brady. A brace from Antoine Griezmann, however, helped France to win the match 2–1 and qualify for the quarter-finals, where they beat a resilient Iceland 5–2 to set up a semi-final clash against world champions and tournament co-favourites Germany. France won the match 2–0, marking their first win over Germany at a major tournament since 1958. France, however, were beaten by Portugal 1–0 in the final courtesy of an extra-time goal by Eder. Griezmann was named the Player of the Tournament and was also awarded the Golden Boot in addition to being named in the Team of the Tournament, alongside Dimitri Payet. The defeat meant that France became the second nation to have lost the final on home soil, after Portugal lost the final to Greece in 2004.

In 2018 FIFA World Cup qualifying, France topped their group with 23 points; winning 7 wins, drawing 2 and losing once, although their two draws were against considerably weaker nations, drawing 0–0 with Belarus in their opening match and against Luxembourg, failing to secure a win against the latter for the first time since 1914, nearly 103 years. Their only defeat of the qualifying phase was against Sweden; losing 2–1 in the last few minutes following an error from goalkeeper Hugo Lloris. France secured qualification to the World Cup finals with a 2–1 win over Belarus after defeating the Netherlands 4–0 at home a few weeks earlier. They were drawn to play Australia, Peru and Denmark in a group in which they were considered heavy favourites. Overall, due to the strength and value of their squad, France were tipped by many as one of the favourites for the title. France, however, had a somewhat disappointing performance in the group stage, only managing a 2–1 win over Australia and a 1–0 win over Peru, followed by a match against Denmark which finished in a 0–0 draw. France beat Argentina 4–3 in the round of sixteen and then Uruguay 2–0 to qualify for the semi-final stage, where they beat Belgium 1–0 courtesy of a goal from defender Samuel Umtiti. Belgium had defeated Japan in the second round, coming back from 2–0 down to win 3–2; France adopted a tactical approach to counter the Belgian attack: Les Bleus played a low block to not leave any space to the Belgians and relied mostly on counter-attacking play, this defensive approach proved successful but led to criticism from some Belgian players who felt they were better than France. On 15 July, France beat Croatia in the final 4–2 to win the World Cup for the second time. Didier Deschamps became the third man to win the World Cup as a player and a coach and also became the second man to win the title as a captain and a coach. Kylian Mbappé was awarded the Best Young Player award and Antoine Griezmann was awarded the Bronze Ball and the Silver Boot for their performance during the tournament. Upon scoring in the final, Mbappé became only the second teenager to score in a World Cup Final, the first being Pelé in 1958.

Home stadium

During France's early years, the team's national stadium alternated between the Parc des Princes in Paris and the Stade Olympique Yves-du-Manoir in Colombes. France also hosted matches at the Stade Pershing, Stade de Paris, and the Stade Buffalo, but to a minimal degree. As the years moved forward, France began hosting matches outside the city of Paris at such venues as the Stade Marcel Saupin in Nantes, the Stade Vélodrome in Marseille, the Stade de Gerland in Lyon, and the Stade de la Meinau in Strasbourg.

Following the renovation of the Parc des Princes in 1972, which gave the stadium the largest capacity in Paris, France moved into the venue permanently. The team still hosted friendly matches and minor FIFA World Cup and UEFA European Football Championship qualification matches at other venues. Twice France have played home matches in a French overseas department – in 2005 against Costa Rica in Fort-de-France (Martinique) and in 2010 against China in Saint Pierre (Réunion). Both matches were friendlies.

In 1998, the Stade de France was inaugurated as France's national stadium ahead of the 1998 World Cup. Located in Saint-Denis, a Parisian suburb, the stadium has an all-seater capacity of 81,338. France's first match at the stadium was played on 28 January 1998 against Spain. France won the match 1–0, with Zinedine Zidane scoring the goal. Since that match, France has used the stadium for almost every major home game, including the 1998 World Cup final.

Prior to matches, home or away, the national team trains at the INF Clairefontaine academy in Clairefontaine-en-Yvelines. Clairefontaine is the national association football centre and is among 12 élite academies throughout the country. The centre was inaugurated in 1976 by former FFF president Fernand Sastre and opened in 1988. The center drew media spotlight following its usage as a base camp by the team that won the 1998 World Cup.

In the 20th and 23rd minute of an international friendly on 13 November 2015, against Germany, three groups of terrorists attempted to detonate bomb vests, at three entrances of Stade de France, and two explosions occurred. Play would continue, until the 94th minute, in order to keep the crowd from panicking. Consequently, the stadium was evacuated through the unaffected gates of the stadium away from the players benches. Due to the blocked exits, spectators who could not leave the stadium had to go down to the pitch and wait until it was safer.

Team image

Media coverage
The national team has a broadcasting agreement with TF1 Group, who the Federal Council of the FFF agreed to extend its exclusive broadcasting agreement with the channel. The new deal grants the channel exclusive broadcast rights for the matches of national team, which include friendlies and international games for the next four seasons beginning in August 2010 and ending in June 2014. TF1 will also have extended rights, notably on the Internet, and may also broadcast images of the national team in its weekly program, Téléfoot. The FFF will receive €45 million a season, a €10 million decrease from the €55 million they received from the previous agreement reached in 2006.

After France won their second World Cup in 2018, M6 together with TF1 broadcast all international fixtures featuring France respectively until 2022.

Friendlies and qualifiers

Finals tournament

Kits and crest

The France national team utilizes a three colour system composed of blue, white, and red. The team's three colours originate from the national flag of France, known as the tricolore. Nevertheless, the first France shirt (as seen in their first official international match against Belgium in 1904) was white, with the two interlinked rings emblem of USFSA –the body that controlled sport in France by then– on the left.

France normally wear blue shirts, white shorts, and red socks at home (similar setup to Japan), while, when on the road, the team utilizes an all-white combination or wear red shirts, blue shorts, and blue socks with the former being the most current. Between 1909 and 1914, France wore a white shirt with blue stripes, white shorts, and red socks. In a 1978 World Cup match against Hungary in Mar del Plata, both teams arrived at Estadio José María Minella with white kits, so France played in green-and-white striped shirts borrowed from Club Atlético Kimberley.

Beginning in 1966, France had its shirts made by Le Coq Sportif until 1971. In 1972, France reached an agreement with German sports apparel manufacturer Adidas to be the team's kit provider. Over the next 38 years, the two would maintain a healthy relationship with France winning Euro 1984, the 1998 World Cup and Euro 2000 while wearing Adidas' famous tricolour three stripes. During the 2006 World Cup, France wore an all-white change strip in all four of its knockout matches, including the final. On 22 February 2008, the FFF announced that they were ending their partnership with Adidas and signing with Nike, effective 1 January 2011. The deal was valued at €320 million over seven years (1 January 2011 – 9 July 2018), making France's blue shirt the most expensive sponsorship in the history of football.

The first France kit worn in a major tournament produced by Nike was the Euro 2012 strip, which was all dark blue and used gold as an accent colour. In February 2013, Nike revealed an all baby blue change strip.

In advance of France's hosting of Euro 2016, Nike unveiled a new, unconventional kit set: blue shirts and shorts with red socks at home, white shirts and shorts and with blue socks away. The away shirt as worn in pre-Euro friendlies and released to the public also featured one blue sleeve and one red sleeve in reference to the "tricolore". However, due to UEFA regulations, France was forced to wear a modified version with the sleeve colours almost desaturated in their Euro 2016 group stage game against Switzerland, which continued to be worn during 2018 World Cup qualifying.

Kit sponsorship

Kit deals

Nickname
France is often referred to by the media and supporters as Les Bleus (The Blues), which is the nickname associated with all of France's international sporting teams due to the blue shirts each team incorporates. The team is also referred to as Les Tricolores or L'Equipe Tricolore (The Tri-color Team) due to the team's utilization of the country's national colors: blue, white, and red. During the 1980s, France earned the nickname the "Brazilians of Europe" mainly due to the accolades of the "carré magique" ("Magic Square"), who were anchored by Michel Platini. Led by coach Michel Hidalgo, France exhibited an inspiring, elegant, skillful and technically advanced offensive style of football, which was strikingly similar to their South American counterparts. Despite being offence oriented, France's defence is considered one of the best in world for their aggression and technicality. Their defence played a vital role in winning the 2018 FIFA World Cup and had earned them the title of "Mur de fer" ("The Iron Wall").

Results and fixtures

The following is a list of match results from the previous 12 months, as well as any future matches that have been scheduled.

2022

2023

Coaching staff

As of August 2019.

Coaching history

Managers in italics were hired as caretakers

Players

Current squad
The following 23 players were called up for the UEFA Euro 2024 qualifying matches against the Netherlands and the Republic of Ireland on 24 and 27 March 2023, respectively.

Caps and goals as of 18 December 2022, after the match against Argentina.

Recent call-ups
The following players have been called up within the past twelve months.

INJ Withdrew due to injury
PRE Preliminary squad
RET Retired from the national team
SUS Serving suspension

Player of the Year

Player records

Players in bold are still active with France.

Most appearances

Most goals

Competitive record

 Champions   Runners-up   Third place   Tournament played on home soil

FIFA World Cup

France was one of the four European teams that participated at the inaugural World Cup in 1930 and have appeared in 16 FIFA World Cups. The national team is one of eight national teams to have won the World Cup. France won their first World Cup title in 1998 on home soil by defeating Brazil 3–0 in the final match.

In 2006, France finished as runners-up losing 5–3 on penalties to Italy. The team has also finished in third place on two occasions in 1958 and 1986 and in fourth place once in 1982. The team's worst results in the competition were first-round eliminations in 2002 and 2010. In 2002, the team suffered an unexpected loss to Senegal and departed the tournament without scoring a goal, while in 2010, a French team torn apart by conflict between the players and staff lost two of three matches and drew the other.

In 2014, France advanced to the quarterfinal before losing 1–0 to the eventual champion, Germany. Four years later, France defeated Croatia 4–2 in the final match and won the World Cup for the second time. In 2022, France finished runners-up to Argentina, losing 4–2 on penalties.

UEFA European Championship

France is one of the most successful nations at the UEFA European Championship having won two titles in 1984 and 2000. The team is just below Spain and Germany who have won three titles each. France hosted the inaugural competition in 1960 and have appeared in nine UEFA European Championship tournaments, tied for fourth-best. The team won their first title on home soil in 1984 and were led by Ballon d'Or winner Michel Platini. In 2000, the team, led by FIFA World Player of the Year Zinedine Zidane, won its second title in Belgium and the Netherlands. The team's worst result in the competition was a first-round elimination in 1992 and 2008.

*Draws include knockout matches decided on penalty kicks.

UEFA Nations League

*Draws include knockout matches decided on penalty kicks.
**Group stage played home and away. Flag shown represents host nation for the finals stage.

FIFA Confederations Cup

France have appeared in two of the eight FIFA Confederations Cups contested and won the competition on both appearances. The team's two titles place in second place only trailing Brazil who have won four. France won their first Confederations Cup in 2001 having appeared in the competition as a result of winning the FIFA World Cup in 1998. The team defeated Japan 1–0 in the final match. In the following Confederations Cup in 2003, France, appearing in the competition as the host country, won the competition beating Cameroon 1–0 after extra time.

CONMEBOL–UEFA Cup of Champions

Honours

This is a list of honours for the senior France national team

 FIFA World Cup
 Champions (2): 1998, 2018
 Runners-up: 2006, 2022
 Third place: 1958, 1986
 Fourth place: 1982

 UEFA European Championship
 Champions (2): 1984, 2000
 Runners-up: 2016
 Third place: 1996
 Fourth place: 1960

 UEFA Nations League
 Champions (1): 2021

 FIFA Confederations Cup
 Champions (2): 2001, 2003

 CONMEBOL–UEFA Cup of Champions 
 Champions (1): 1985

 Olympic Games 
 Champions (1): 1984
 Runners-up: 1900

See also

 France women's national football team
 France Olympic football team
 France national under-21 football team
 France national youth football team
 French Guiana national football team
 Guadeloupe national football team
 Martinique national football team
 New Caledonia national football team
 Réunion national football team
 Saint Martin national football team
 Tahiti national football team
 Ligue 1
 Football in France
 Sport in France

Notes

References

External links

Official website 
France at UEFA
France at FIFA

 
European national association football teams
UEFA European Championship-winning countries
FIFA World Cup-winning countries
FIFA Confederations Cup-winning countries
UEFA Nations League-winning countries
Laureus World Sports Awards winners